Eschiva of Ibelin (1160–1196) was a queen consort of Cyprus. 

She was the daughter of Baldwin of Ibelin (died 1187), lord of Ramla, and of Richilde de Bethsan, and a member of the influential Ibelin family.

She married Aimery of Cyprus (1145–1205), constable of the kingdom of Jerusalem, later king of Cyprus (1194–1205) and of Jerusalem (1197–1205).

Issue
Bourgogne (1180 † 1210), married Walter of Montbéliard, who was regent for her younger brother, Hugh I of Cyprus, from 1205 to 1210
Guy, died young
John, died young
Hugh I, King of Cyprus
Helvis, married Raymond-Roupen of Antioch
Alix, died young

References

Sources
This page is a translation of :fr:Echive d'Ibelin (morte en 1196).

Cypriot queens consort
Women of the Crusader states
1160 births
1196 deaths
Medieval Cyprus
House of Ibelin
House of Lusignan